The High Country is a 1981 Canadian adventure film directed  by Harvey Hart and starring Timothy Bottoms and Linda Purl.

Plot
A city man on the run from the law is guided through mountainous country by a rural woman with a learning disability. Despite their different backgrounds, they come to respect and love each other as her family and the police close in.

Cast  
 Timothy Bottoms as Jim
 Linda Purl as Kathy
  George Sims  as Larry
  James Coleman as Casey  
  Bill Berry  as Carter
  Walter Mills as Clem
  Paul Coeur as Squeaky

References

External links 

1980s adventure films
Canadian adventure films
English-language Canadian films
Films directed by Harvey Hart
Crown International Pictures films
1980s English-language films
1980s Canadian films